Major-General Zachary Raymond Stenning,  is a senior British Army officer who has been serving as the Commandant of the Royal Military Academy Sandhurst since August 2022.

Military career
Stenning was commissioned into the Royal Engineers on 4 September 1995. He was transferred to the Green Howards on 1 August 1996. He became chief of staff of 3rd (United Kingdom) Division in October 2013, and commander of 1st Armoured Infantry Brigade in September 2016. He was promoted to major general on 29 July 2022, and was appointed Commandant of the Royal Military Academy Sandhurst in August 2022.

Stenning received the Queen's Commendation for Valuable Service in the former Yugoslavia in 1997. He was appointed a Member of the Order of the British Empire for services in Iraq in July 2008 and advanced to Officer of the Order of the British Empire for services in Afghanistan in 2013.

References

Living people
Officers of the Order of the British Empire
British Army major generals
Year of birth missing (living people)